Whiteleaf may refer to:

 Whiteleaf, Buckinghamshire
 Whiteleaf Cross, after which the above hamlet is named
 Whiteleaf Public School